Aplatamus is a genus of beetles in the family Silvanidae, containing the following species:

 Aplatamus difficilis Sharp
 Aplatamus dispar Sharp
 Aplatamus grouvellei Sharp
 Aplatamus mexicanus Grouvelle
 Aplatamus uniformis Sharp

References

Silvanidae genera